Thuravikkadu is a village in the Pattukkottai taluk of Thanjavur district, Tamil Nadu, India.

Demographics 

As per the 2001 census, Thuravikkadu had a total population of 3071 with 1534 males and 1537 females. The sex ratio was 1002. The literacy rate was 70.63.

References 

 

Villages in Thanjavur district